Rivers of Light was a nighttime show at Disney's Animal Kingdom in the Walt Disney World Resort. Located in the park's Discovery River lagoon between Discovery Island and Expedition Everest, the show featured water fountains, mist screens, floating lanterns, fire effects, lasers, lights, fog, projection mapping, and until September 2018, live performers. Lakeside seating areas were able to accommodate 5,000 guests. 

Rivers of Light was initially developed as a nighttime parade by Steve Davison, but due to the need of infrastructural changes to Discovery Island to necessitate better viewing that would diminish the horticultural character of the area, this version of the project was cancelled in 2008. Following the debut of World of Color, the concept for Rivers of Light was revisited and took on the form of a nighttime lagoon show; it first announced in October 2013 as part of the park's expansion plans, which included Pandora–The World of Avatar and a nocturnal version of Kilimanjaro Safaris. Construction began in 2014. Walt Disney Imagineering and Walt Disney Creative Entertainment designed the show along with longtime collaborators Michael Curry, Don L. Harper and Mark Mancina.

The show was originally set to premiere on April 22, 2016, Earth Day and the park's 18th anniversary. However, on April 5, 2016, it was announced that the show had been delayed and would not be able to meet the April 22 premiere date. A portion of the show was previewed to media on April 19, 2016, when it was also announced that The Jungle Book: Alive with Magic, a limited-engagement show based on the 2016 live-action film, would fill the space of the delayed Rivers of Light night-time show. The show ran until September 5, 2016. On February 9, 2017, it was announced that Rivers of Light would open on February 17, 2017. The show began previews on February 10, 2017.

A retooled version of the show featuring animated characters, titled Rivers of Light: We Are One, debuted on Memorial Day Weekend 2019. The show was suspended in March 2020 owing to the COVID-19 pandemic and in July 2020, park officials confirmed rumors that the show would be retired.

Show summary

Act I: Gifts of Light

Before the show begins, four lotus floats gradually drift onto the Discovery River Lagoon while fireflies awaken and the shadows of the four Animal Spirit Guides can be seen moving through the trees. The fireflies function as a visual element throughout the show, seemingly illuminating barges and occasionally accenting visual elements projected on water screens.

The show begins with the arrival of two teams of mystical storytellers on their respective lantern sailboats, playing a musical fanfare accompanied by the cries of animals. On the Asia side of the lagoon are Shaman Aditya (whose instrument is a horn) and Acolyte Ketu, representing the element of fire. On the Dinoland side of the lagoon are Shaman Aseema (whose instrument is a flute) and her Acolyte Ambu, representing the element of water. These characters are silent and communicate only through pantomime, dance, shadow puppetry, and music, leaving a narrator to explain what we are about to see. These performers were removed on September 29, 2018 as the result of budget cuts.

Act II: Parade of the Animal Spirits

As the narration ends, the storytellers introduce us to the four Animal Spirit guides, each representing one of the four elements. Taking the form of large sculpted lantern barges, they consist of a Tiger (representing Fire), an African Elephant and her calf (representing Earth), a Sea Turtle and its offspring (representing Water), and a Great Horned Owl with her owlets (representing Air). Moving across the lagoon and changing color to the music, the Animal Spirits begin to leave their lanterns one by one and take to the sky in an astral form, bringing the lotuses to life and heralding the arrival of the Temple Lotus.

Act III: Dance of the Lotus

After the animal spirits have left their lanterns, the lotuses take center stage, flanking the central Temple Lotus barge. Aseema conducts the lotuses in their fountain ballet and has the shadow puppet-like figures of the turtle and owls dance amongst them on the water while the storytellers provide percussion.

Act IV: We Are One
After the Dance of the Lotus ends, Aditya plays his horn to call the Tiger spirit into action, who proceeds to leapfrog across the lotuses and begin a journey through the different realms of the Animal Spirits. Accompanied by the original song "We Are One" and utilizing footage taken from the Disneynature documentary series, we travel through the tiger's dense jungles, the sea turtle's ocean home and the savanna of the African Elephant. The song is interrupted by a scene taken from African Cats, where a lion chases after a mother cheetah on its territory, who manages to make a narrow escape and get her cubs to safety. Aseema and her boat reappear and she sends the owl up from her boat to take us to the snowy regions of Alaska seen in Bears and the song resumes with a montage of animal families, ending on a flock of flamingos and the sounds of Aseema and Aditya's instruments as the two boats go back to center stage.

Act V: Rivers of Light
In a scene inspired visually and musically by the "Transformation" sequence in Brother Bear, the storytellers call upon the aurora borealis (the titular "Rivers of Light"), which starts to appear over the lagoon. Spirits of countless animals begin rushing and marching through the lights as the storytellers bask in the beautiful glow.  The aurora fades on an image of a humpback whale breach and gives way to the night sky and animals in the constellations. As the Animal Spirit Guides return to their lantern barges, the narrator returns for concluding remarks.

The Temple Lotus opens up to reveal a tower of fire that blasts to the beat of a grand finale reprise of We Are One. The animals return and the fireflies emerge from the Tree of Life in the form of spotlights.

Music

Soundtrack 
The music for River of Light was composed by Don Harper, Mark Mancina, and Dave Metzger, with lyrics by Miriam Stockley and Mancina. The entire soundtrack for the show, as well as that of Tree of Life: Awakenings, was released in a combined soundtrack album by Walt Disney Records on June 2, 2017.

Track listing

Notes

  Includes "Steady as the Beating Drum" by Alan Menken and Stephen Schwartz, "Love Is a Song", "Little April Shower" by Frank Churchill and Larry Morey, "Epilogue" by James Newton Howard, "Two Worlds" by Phil Collins, "First Day", "Nemo Egg" by Thomas Newman, "Jake's First Flight" by James Horner, "I Wan'na Be Like You (The Monkey Song)" by Richard M. Sherman and Robert B. Sherman, "Circle of Life" by Elton John and Tim Rice.

Show Barges 
Rivers of Light consisted of 11 show barges that are all computer controlled.  Each barge consists of 4 thrusters in a square configuration with the exception of the two lantern sailboat barges, which previously carried the show's live cast, two pairs of Shaman storytellers and their apprentices, representing different elements.
 Tiger
 Owl
 Turtle
 Elephant
 Lotus 1
 Lotus 2
 Lotus 3
 Lotus 4
 Temple Lotus
 Fire Lantern Sailboat (featuring Shaman Aditya and Acolyte Ketu) 
 Water Lantern Sailboat (featuring Shaman Aseema and Acolyte Ambu)

See also
World of Color
Fantasmic!
Disney Dreams!

References

Amusement park attractions introduced in 2017
Amusement park attractions that closed in 2019
Amusement park attractions introduced in 2019
Amusement park attractions that closed in 2020
Walt Disney Parks and Resorts entertainment
Disney's Animal Kingdom
Asia (Disney's Animal Kingdom)
2017 establishments in Florida
2020 disestablishments in Florida